The All Blacks first played against Scotland in 1905 at Inverleith field in Edinburgh, during the historic 1905–1906 All Blacks tour of Europe and North America. The two teams have played 32 times, with New Zealand winning 30 matches and 2 drawn matches. Scotland have yet to register a victory in 117 years of fixtures between the two teams. The most recent test was played at Murrayfield on 13 November 2022, with New Zealand winning 31-23.

Summary

Overall

Records
Note: Date shown in brackets indicates when the record was or last set.

Results

List of series

References

New Zealand national rugby union team matches
Scotland national rugby union team matches